Grade is a surname. Notable people with the surname include:

Hans Grade (1879–1946), German aviation pioneer
Leslie Grade (1916–1979), British theatrical agent
Lew Grade, Baron Grade (1906–1998), British impresario
Michael Grade (born 1943), British television executive and businessman